The 2020 Football Championship of Cherkasy Oblast is the 67th season of the competition.

Two teams withdrew from the competition Nasha Riaba Katerynopil and Dnipro Cherkasy.

League table

External links

Football
Cherkasy
Cherkasy